Raffaele De Rosa (born 25 March 1987 in Naples) is an Italian motorcycle road racer. He competes in the Supersport World Championship aboard a Kawasaki Ninja ZX-6R, he won the FIM Superstock 1000 Cup in 2016.

Career

125cc World Championship (2004–2008)
De Rosa made his World Championship debut in the 125cc class in the 2005 season.

250cc/Moto2 World Championship (2009–2011)
De Rosa was the Rookie of The Year in the 250cc Class in 2009.

Career statistics

Career highlights
2003 – 29th, Italian 125cc Championship #35 Aprilia RS125
2004 – 15th, Italian 125cc Championship #35 Honda RS125
2005 – 23rd, 125cc World Championship #35 Aprilia RS125
2006 – 16th, 125cc World Championship #35 Aprilia RS125
2007 – 16th, 125cc World Championship #35 Aprilia RS125
2008 – 18th, 125cc World Championship #35 KTM FRR 125
2009 – 6th, 250cc World Championship #35 Honda RS250RW
2010 – 27th, Moto2 World Championship #35 Tech 3 Mistral 610
2011 – 33rd, Moto2 World Championship #35 Moriwaki, FTR, Suter
2012 – 24th, Supersport World Championship #35 Honda CBR600RR
2013 – 19th, Supersport World Championship #5 Honda CBR600RR
2014 – 10th, Supersport World Championship #35 Honda CBR600RR
2015 – 3rd, FIM Superstock 1000 Cup #35 Ducati 1199 Panigale
2016 – 1st, FIM Superstock 1000 Cup #35 BMW S1000RR
2017 – 15th, Superbike World Championship #35 BMW S1000RR
2018 – 6th, Supersport World Championship #35 MV Agusta F3 675
2019 – 6th, Supersport World Championship #35 MV Agusta F3 675
2020 – 6th, Supersport World Championship #35 MV Agusta F3 675

Grand Prix motorcycle racing

Races by year
(key) (Races in bold indicate pole position, races in italics indicate fastest lap)

Superbike World Championship

Races by year
(key) (Races in bold indicate pole position, races in italics indicate fastest lap)

Supersport World Championship

Races by year
(key) (Races in bold indicate pole position, races in italics indicate fastest lap)

 Season still in progress.

FIM Superstock 1000 Cup

Races by year
(key) (Races in bold indicate pole position, races in italics indicate fastest lap)

References

External links

250cc World Championship riders
125cc World Championship riders
Italian motorcycle racers
1987 births
Living people
Moto2 World Championship riders
Superbike World Championship riders
Supersport World Championship riders
FIM Superstock 1000 Cup riders